"Relax In The City / Pick Me Up" is a single by Japanese trio Perfume, released in Japan on April 26, 2015.  It is the third single from their fifth studio album COSMIC EXPLORER.  As individual tracks, Pick Me Up was released digitally on May 6, 2015. Relax In The City was released digitally on April 8, 2015.

Music video
As a double A side, both tracks were released with music videos. The video for Pick Me Up, which features a cameo from American group OK Go, was released globally on March 31, 2015, with the video for Relax In The City following shortly after. A short version of Relax In The City was released on April 13, 2015, while a full-length music was released on May 12, 2015.

Track listings

References

2015 songs
Perfume (Japanese band) songs
2015 singles
Japanese-language songs
Song recordings produced by Yasutaka Nakata
Songs written by Yasutaka Nakata
Universal J singles